Information source may refer to:

Information source (mathematics), a kind of sequence of random variables
Source text, a text (sometimes oral) from which information or ideas are derived
 Guide to information sources, a kind of "metabibliography". Ideally it is not just a listing of bibliographies, reference works  and other source texts, but more like a textbook introducing users to the information sources in a given field (in general).
 , a grapheme used to indicate the existence of an information board or to highlight other information in a manual

See also
 Guide to information sources